Luys Bien is a Dominican singer, musician and songwriter. He interprets poetical lyrics with a melodious voice in a variety of Latin music genres, including bachata, merengue, bolero and salsa.
Luys Bien's most recent release, Latidos de Tambor, is a collaboration with Ramón Orlando.

Biography
Luys Bien debuted in December 2020 with Firme Albor, an EP of five songs written by Dominican poet Cristino Gómez. Firme Albor tells the story of a lover whom moves from living in solitude and sad verses to living the dreamed love and singing lovely tunes. A year later, in December 2021, Luys Bien released "Mujer Amiga" a merengue arranged and produced by Dominican legendary musician Ramón Orlando.

Previously, in 2021 Luys Bien released three singles adapted from Taiwanese songs that he interpreted in Spanish and in Latin rhythms. The adaptations are from the songs "Ho Hay Yan 喔嗨洋" by Suming, "Angel (天使)" by Mayday, and "Insomne (無眠)" by Sodagreen.

Also in 2021, Luys Bien aired the singles "Aún Te Amo" and "Déjame Nacer", a lullaby at Dominican rhythm pambiche.

In summer of 2022, Luys Bien released the merengue "Nos Queremos Tanto".

Discography

EP
 Firme Albor (2020)

Singles
 "Aún Te Amo" (2021) 
 "Ho Hay Yan" (2021) 
 "Déjame Nacer"(2021)
 "Ángel" (2021)
 "Insomne" (2021)
 "Mujer Amiga" (2021)
 "Nos Queremos Tanto" (2022)
 "Latidos de Tambor" (2022) with Ramón Orlando

References

External links
 Luys Bien on Jaxsta 

Dominican Republic musicians
21st-century Dominican Republic male singers
Latin music record producers
Latin music songwriters
Bachata musicians
Dominican Republic songwriters
Male songwriters
Merengue musicians
Year of birth missing (living people)
Living people